Spermezeu is a commune in Bistrița-Năsăud County, Transylvania, Romania. It is composed of eight villages: Dobricel (Kisdebrek), Dumbrăvița (Dögmező), Hălmăsău (Helmesaljavölgy), Lunca Borlesei, Păltineasa (Jávorvölgy), Sita (Szita), Spermezeu and Șesuri Spermezeu-Vale (Síktelep). Dobricel and Dumbrăvița were part of Căianu Mic Commune until 2004.

References

Communes in Bistrița-Năsăud County
Localities in Transylvania